Semri Bazyaft is a village in the Bhopal district of Madhya Pradesh, India. It is in the Huzur tehsil and the Phanda block.

Demographics 

According to the 2011 census of India, Semri Bazyaft has 191 households. The effective literacy rate (i.e. the literacy rate excluding children aged 6 and below) is 65.33%.

References 

Villages in Huzur tehsil